Ana Clara Reis Duarte (born 11 June 1989) is a Brazilian former tennis player. She won the bronze medal in mixed-doubles tournament at the 2011 Pan American Games.

Duarte won six singles and 15 doubles titles at tournamenta of the ITF Circuit in her career. On 6 June 2011, she reached her best singles ranking of world No. 221. On 10 October 2011, she peaked at No. 182 in the doubles rankings.

ITF Circuit finals

Singles: 20 (6 titles, 14 runner-ups)

Doubles: 30 (15 titles, 15 runner-ups)

External links
 
 
 

1989 births
Living people
Sportspeople from Rio de Janeiro (city)
Brazilian female tennis players
Tennis players at the 2011 Pan American Games
Pan American Games bronze medalists for Brazil
Pan American Games medalists in tennis
Medalists at the 2011 Pan American Games
21st-century Brazilian women
20th-century Brazilian women